Colvin & Earle is a studio album from American folk and roots musicians Shawn Colvin and Steve Earle, released in 2016. The recording is a product of a decades-long friendship between the two singer-songwriters and has garnered positive critical reception.

Recording and release
Shaw Colvin and Steve Earle first met in the mid-1980s, when Earle was on tour and Colvin was an opening act and she first met album producer Buddy Miller in the 1970s. The two became friends and Colvin covered Earle's song "Someday" on her 1994 album Cover Girl. This project was inaugurated by Colvin, who reached out to Earle to collaborate in 2014, initially planning on only touring together. The duo participated in three songwriting sessions and chose a few covers to perform to make up the album. The track "You’re Still Gone" was begun by Miller's wife Julie Miller and completed by Colvin and Earle; this is a departure for Earle, who had not co-written before. The duo promoted this album with a tour and the singles "You're Right (I'm Wrong)" and "Come What May".

Reception
The editorial staff of AllMusic Guide gave this album 3.5 out of five stars, with reviewer Mark Deming for having "a lively and spontaneous atmosphere", with production that creates "a sound that's rich but doesn't sound fussed over". Robin Denselow of The Guardian gave the album three out of five stars, noting the versatility of Earle's musicianship. For NPR's First Listen, Jewly Hight gave a positive review that highlighted the unique blending of the performers' strengths, summing up, "tousled nature of their mutuality makes [the album] arresting". In American Songwriter, Hal Horowitz scored this album 3.5 out of five stars for the "alluring, attractive pairing" of the musicians and producer, along with the craftsmanship of the backing band.

Track listing
"Come What May" (Shawn Colvin and Steve Earle) – 3:13
"Tell Moses" (Colvin and Earle) – 3:41
"Tobacco Road" (John D. Loudermilk) – 2:50
"Ruby Tuesday" (Jagger/Richards) – 3:35
"The Way That We Do" (Colvin and Earle) – 4:21
"Happy and Free" (Colvin and Earle) – 2:17
"You Were on My Mind" (Sylvia Fricker) – 2:57
"You’re Right (I’m Wrong)" (Colvin and Earle) – 4:14
"Raise the Dead" (Emmylou Harris) – 2:51
"You’re Still Gone" (Colvin, Earle, and Julie Miller) – 3:40
Bonus tracks on deluxe edition
"Someday" (Earle) – 3:52
"That Don’t Worry Me Now" (Colvin and John Leventhal) – 3:16
"Baby's in Black" (Lennon/McCartney) – 2:23

Personnel
Shawn Colvin – guitar, vocals
Steve Earle – guitar, vocals, mandolin, bouzouki, mandocello, harmonica
Richard Bennett – guitar
Andrew Darby – mastering assistance
Collin Dupuis – engineering, mixing at Club Roar
Fred Eltringham – drums, percussion
Adam Grover – mastering assistance
Stephanie Hamood – engineering assistance
Timothy Hogan – logo design
Kelley Looney – bass guitar on "You're Right (I'm Wrong)" and "Raise the Dead"
Andrew Mendelson – mastering at Georgetown Masters
Buddy Miller – guitar, harmonium, production
Gabe Millman – mastering assistance
Carrie Smith – package design
Alexandra Valenti – photography
Chris Wood – bass guitar

See also
List of 2016 albums

References

External links

2016 albums
Shawn Colvin albums
Collaborative albums
Steve Earle albums
Fantasy Records albums
Albums produced by Buddy Miller